Chuni Kotal was a Dalit Adivasi of Lodha Shabar tribe, a Scheduled Tribes of India, who in 1985 became the first woman graduate among the Lodha Shabars.

Her death through suicide on 16 August 1992, after years of harassment by officials, united the Lodha Shabar community in a big way. Eventually her story was highlighted by noted writer-activist Mahasweta Devi in her book in Bengali,  Byadhkhanda in (1994), ( The Book of the Hunter (2002))

Har Na Mana Har (2021) is a Bengali novel has been written by Subhabrata Basu based on her tragic life

Biography
Born in 1965, in village Gohaldihi, in Paschim Medinipur district, West Bengal, into a poor Lodha family with 3 brothers and 3 sisters, Chuni Kotal survived a childhood of impoverishment to become the first woman from a 'primitive' tribe to complete High School. Thereafter, she got her first job as a Lodha Social worker in 1983 at Jhargram ITDP office, surveying local villages.

Eventually she graduated in anthropology from Vidyasagar University, in 1985. Two years after graduating, she was appointed as a Hostel superintendent at 'Rani Shiromoni SC and ST Girls' Hostel' at Medinipur, here again she had to face the social stigma attached with her tribe.

Trouble really began for her when she joined the Masters course (MSc) at the local Vidyasagar University. Here she was allegedly discriminated against university administrators, who refused to give her the requisite pass grades, despite her having fulfilled the criteria, who opined that a low-born person coming from a "criminal tribe", a Denotified tribe of India, hence did not have the social privilege and pre-ordained destiny to study "higher discourse" like the social sciences. In 1991, after losing two years at the course, she complained, and a high level enquiry commission was set up by the state Education minister to no avail, once the fact that she belonged to a former criminal tribe came to light.

Death
On 14 August 1992, frustrated by years casteist and racist harassment at Medinipur, she left Medinipur and went to meet her husband, Manmatha Savar, who had been working at Railway workshop at Kharagpur. They had known each other since 1981 and later married in 1990 through a court marriage; Manmatha was a high school graduate himself. It was here that she committed suicide on 16 August 1992, at the age of 27.

Her death became the focal point of immense political, human rights and social controversy in the media in West Bengal, and eastern India, where the discourse is traditionally Brahmin-Baniya dominated. However, her death did not receive the attention of Indian American social science professors as it did among Western social scientists who were studying the Indian caste system, like Professor Nicholas B. Dirks at Columbia University and Professor Jan Breman at the University of Amsterdam.

Upon her death, Bangla Dalit Sahitya Sanstha, Kolkata, organized a mass movement through different seminars and street corners, street play protesting against university teachers, on the street of Kolkata. Since 1993, it organizes the Annual Chuni Kotal Memorial Lecture in Kolkata every year. Later a motivational video film has been produced on her life story by Department of Education, Govt. of India

References

External links
 Review of Mahasweta Devi's The Book of the Hunter by Uma Mahadevan-Dasgupta in The Hindu. Retrieved 23 March 2007.

Scheduled Tribes of India
People from Paschim Medinipur district
Indian anthropologists
Indian caste leaders
Victims of human rights abuses
Suicides in India
1965 births
1992 deaths
Discrimination in India
Vidyasagar University alumni
Indian women activists
Indian women anthropologists
Dalit women
Indian women social scientists
Scientists from West Bengal
Dalit activists
20th-century Indian educators
20th-century Indian women scientists
20th-century Indian social scientists
Women scientists from West Bengal
Activists from West Bengal
Adivasi activists
Adivasi women
Educators from West Bengal
Women educators from West Bengal
20th-century anthropologists
20th-century women educators